Nyhellervatnet is a lake on the border of the municipalities of Hol (in Viken county) and Aurland (in Vestland county), Norway.

See also
List of lakes in Norway

References

Lakes of Viken (county)
Lakes of Vestland